Boyds may refer to:


Places

United States
Boyds, Maryland
Boyds station, a rail station
Boyds, Ohio
Boyds, Washington
Boyds Creek, Tennessee
Boyds Corner Reservoir, Putnam County, New York

Elsewhere
Boyds, Saint Kitts and Nevis
Boyds Beach, Wales

Other
Boyds Bears, collectibles

See also
Boyd (disambiguation)